Karim Shaverdi (born 7 February 1983) is an Iranian footballer.

Club career
Shahverdi has played his entire career for Foolad F.C.

 Assist Goals

References

1983 births
Living people
Foolad FC players
Esteghlal Khuzestan players
Iranian footballers
Association football midfielders
People from Ahvaz
Sportspeople from Khuzestan province